Leone C. Bradbury  (31 December 1905 – December 1983) was an American muralist whose 1930s mural series Flights of Fancy is displayed in the Centennial Hall in Colorado Springs, CO as of October 2014.

She was born to George and Catherine Bradbury in Denver, CO. She attended the University of Denver in 1924 and earned a Bachelor of Fine Arts from Yale University in 1932.

Works 
Bradbury's mural series Flights of Fancy was originally commissioned in the 1930s for the Ellsworth Elementary School in Denver. The series features nine paintings with fairy tale themes. In 2014 the murals were acquired from Denver Public Schools by El Paso County and installed in Centennial Hall.

References

1905 births
1983 deaths
American muralists
Artists from Denver
Place of death missing
American women painters
University of Denver alumni
Yale University alumni
20th-century American women artists
Women muralists